Serpelice  is a village in the administrative district of Gmina Sarnaki, within Łosice County, Masovian Voivodeship, in east-central Poland.

The well known person who comes from Serpelice is Bishop Antoni Pacyfik Dydycz.

There are some leisure centers in which there is gastronomy, the possibility of renting a kayak or boat, fishing areas, lodgings.

The village has a wooden church, built in 1947, by the Order of Friars Minor Capuchin, who also have a monastery in the village.

References

Serpelice